Bernard Garfield (né Bernard Howard Garfield; born May 27, 1924) is an American bassoonist, composer, teacher, and recording artist. Born in Brooklyn, New York, he is best known for his long tenure as the principal bassoonist of the Philadelphia Orchestra from 1957 to 2000.

Career
Garfield studied at New York University (1948 BA, English Literature) and received a master's degree in musical composition from Columbia University in 1950. He received the ARCM diploma from the Royal College of Music in 1945 and an honorary doctorate in 2009 from the Curtis Institute of Music.  He served in the U.S. Army from 1943-1946.

In 1946, Garfield organized the New York Woodwind Quintet, of which he was the director until 1957.  From 1949 to 1957 Garfield held the position of principal bassoonist of the Little Orchestra Society of New York. He was also principal bassoonist with the New York City Ballet Orchestra from 1950 to 1957. Garfield's most noted engagement is his 43 years as the principal bassoonist of the Philadelphia Orchestra, from 1957 to 2000.  Upon his retirement, his position was fulfilled by his student, Daniel Matsukawa.  

As a teacher, Garfield was on the faculty of the Curtis Institute of Music from 1976 to 2008. He also taught at Temple University from 1957-2004.

In addition to performing and teaching, Mr. Garfield is also a noted composer. His compositions include woodwind trios, three quartets for bassoon with string trio, piano solos, songs, and duets for bassoon and piano.  A list of his complete works can be found on his official website. (See the external link below.)

Discography
Among Garfield's solo recordings with the Philadelphia Orchestra are the Mozart Sinfonia Concertante, K. 297b (1957), the Mozart Bassoon Concerto, K. 191 (1961), the Haydn Sinfonia Concertante (1958) and the Weber Andante e Rondo Ongarese, Op. 35 (1962).  A comprehensive list of Mr. Garfield's recordings may also be viewed on his website.

External links
Official website

1924 births
United States Army personnel of World War II
Fiorello H. LaGuardia High School alumni
Columbia University School of the Arts alumni
Living people
American classical bassoonists
New York University alumni
Musicians of the Philadelphia Orchestra
Associates of the Royal College of Music